The Flor Contemplacion Story is a 1995 drama film directed by Joel C. Lamangan and produced by Vic del Rosario Jr. for Viva Films about the story of the Filipina domestic helper who was hanged in Singapore for allegedly killing her fellow maid. The story was chronicled in a film which operates on various personal, social and political levels. Both controversial and critically acclaimed, it has brought Nora Aunor numerous citations for her intense portrayal as the fallen heroine of the story.

The Flor Contemplacion Story was screened and exhibited in different film festivals around the world. The film won the Princess Pataten Statue for best actress for its lead star, Nora Aunor and the film won the Golden Pyramid Award at the 1995 Cairo International Film Festival.

Plot

Just like many impoverished people, Flor (Aunor) thought that by working abroad she could give her family a better life even though it means sacrificing her own happiness. She decided to work as a domestic helper in Singapore thinking that this could be the answer to her problems.  Unlike many other servants, Flor was well-treated by her employers.

However, in 1995, she was arrested and was charged of killing her fellow filipina, Delia Maga and the little boy that she was caring for. After a hasty trial, the Singapore government finds Flor guilty and sentences her to death by hanging. Her predicament brings an outpouring of sympathy from Filipinos, who refuse to believe her guilt. There was also a national appeal for clemency and a re-investigation to be done. Even the office of the President appealed to the Singaporean Government. However, the Singapore Government remained steadfast with their decision.

Flor was executed in March 1995.

Cast
Nora Aunor as Flor Contemplacion
Julio Diaz as Efren Contemplacion
Jacklyn Jose as Neneng
Ian De Leon as Xandrex Contemplacion
Vina Morales as Russel Contemplacion
Jon-Jon Contemplacion as himself
Joel Contemplacion as himself
Tony Mabesa as Department of Foreign Affairs Secretary Roberto Romulo
Ali Sotto as Philippine Ambassador to Singapore Alicia Ramos
Rita Avila as Evangeline Parale/Virginia Parumog
Amy Austria as Delia Maga
Charito Solis as Lydia Montilla 
Gloria Sevilla as Flor's mother
Caridad Sanchez as Flor's mother-in-law 
Ronaldo Valdez as Atty. Romeo Capulong 
Ara Mina as Evelyn Contemplacion
Anthony Cortez as Allan
Bennette Ignacio as Nicholas Huang
Bob Soler as Mayor Vicente Amante
Jim Pebanco as Poe Gratela

Production
Over a week after Flor Contemplacion's execution on March 17, 1995, Viva Films was already negotiating with Romeo Capulong, the lawyer representing Contemplacion's family, for the film rights to her story, with Nora Aunor cast to portray Contemplacion in the anticipated film. On April 5, 1995, Viva Films president Teresita Cruz announced that the studio has officially acquired the film rights to Contemplacion's story, which cost up to ₱2 million. Screenwriter Ricky Lee pushed himself to finish the film's screenplay by his set deadline of April 15 after the rights were acquired.

Critical response
The film received positive reviews, especially for Aunor's acting.

Theme song
The theme song in the film is "Kahit Konting Awa" composed by Vehnee Saturno and interpreted by Aunor herself.

Accolades

International

Philippines

List of Film Festival Competed or Exhibited
1995 - Toronto International Film Festival
1995 - Competition Film, 19th Cairo International Film Festival
 Winner, Golden Pyramid Award (Best Picture)
 Princess Pataten Statue Best Actress, Nora Aunor
1996 - Human Rights Watch International Film Festival New York, June 13
1996 - Pan Asian Film and Video Festival, April 12–26
1996 - 3rd Southeast Asian Film Festival
1996 - Fukuoka International Film Festival, September 13–23, Feature Film: Philippine Films Collection, 
1996 - Hawaii International Film Festival, November
1996 - Pusan International Film Festival, Korea
1996 - Dublin Film Festival, Ireland
2003 - Philippine Film Festival Fukuoka City, Japan, November 1–16

References

External links
 

1995 films
Tagalog-language films
Philippine biographical films
Films directed by Joel Lamangan